John Joseph Ricketts (born July 16, 1941) is an American businessman and philanthropist. He is the founder, former CEO and former chairman of TD Ameritrade. He has a net worth of US$2.7 billion  according to Forbes. He has pursued a variety of other entrepreneurial ventures including DNAinfo.com, High Plains Bison, The Lodge at Jackson Fork, and The American Film Company. Ricketts also engages in philanthropy through The Ricketts Art Foundation, Opportunity Education Foundation, The Cloisters on the Platte Foundation, and The Ricketts Conservation Foundation.

Early life
John Joseph Ricketts was born and raised in Nebraska City, Nebraska, the son of Florence M. (Erhart) and Donavon Platte Ricketts. He obtained a bachelor's degree from Creighton University in Omaha, Nebraska in 1968. Ricketts is married to Marlene Margaret (Volkmer), with whom he has four children, Pete, Thomas, Laura, and Todd, who were raised Roman Catholic. He currently resides in Hoback Basin, Wyoming.

Regarding his time in Omaha during the 1960s, Ricketts wrote in his 2019 memoir The Harder You Work, the Luckier You Get about "stockbrokers destroying their lives with dope, alcohol, and sex, which was just another kind of drug":
Our substance of choice was beer. Beer, whatever its drawbacks, is not dope. Marlene generally did not come out for drinks on Friday at the Rookery. She went home and got supper ready for the children. Often, I did not get home in time to eat with them. I might have had twelve beers on a Friday evening. I might have had more. I'm sure there were a few nights that it was only by the grace of God that I didn't have a car accident. But it was only beer and it helped me get rid of all my pent-up stress. I got myself home, and our family and our business could press on together.

TD Ameritrade
In 1975, Ricketts and a few partners invested $12,500 each to form First Omaha Securities, a retail securities brokerage firm that through mergers and acquisitions grew into Ameritrade, later known as TD Ameritrade. Ricketts retired from the TD Ameritrade board in October 2011 to concentrate on entrepreneurship and philanthropy.

Business ventures

High Plains Bison
In 2004, Ricketts founded High Plains Bison, a retailer of natural bison meat. In addition to online and offline sales channels, High Plains Bison is the official bison vendor at Chicago's Wrigley Field. Some of the bison are raised on a Wyoming ranch owned by Ricketts. A four-bedroom lodge named The Lodge at Jackson Fork Ranch is located on the same property.  Joe Rickett's Grizzly Ridge Bison Ranch in northern Montana comes at the expense of the Blackfeet tribe's wild herd; it represents 2% of their ancestral lands, which the tribe were deprived of despite trying to buy back their own land.

The American Film Company
In 2008, Ricketts founded The American Film Company, which produces feature films about true stories from American history. The Conspirator is a 2010 historical drama film directed by Robert Redford. It served as the debut film of The American Film Company.

DNAinfo.com
In 2009, Ricketts founded DNAinfo.com, a digital news service that used to cover neighborhood news in New York City and Chicago. Ricketts shut it down on November 2, 2017, one week after their employees voted to unionize. Gone with it were Gothamist, Chicagoist, DCist, LAist, SFist, and Shanghaiist. On the 3rd of November, 2017, archived versions of Gothamist, DNAinfo, and other sites were back up. In September 2017, Ricketts wrote, "I believe unions promote a corrosive us-against-them dynamic that destroys the esprit de corps businesses need to succeed."

Chicago Cubs baseball team
In October 2009, the Ricketts family acquired a 95 percent controlling interest in Major League Baseball's Chicago Cubs and Wrigley Field, as well as 20% of Comcast Sportsnet Chicago. The Ricketts family represents the eighth ownership group in the 133-year history of the team. While Ricketts is not directly involved in the team's operations, his son, Tom Ricketts, is Cubs chairman and his three other children (Pete, Laura and Todd) are on the board of directors. In 2016, seven years after purchasing the Cubs, they won the World Series, ending a 108-year-old drought without a championship.

Political activities
Ricketts co-founded the Campaign for Primary Accountability (CPA) with Eric O'Keefe, Leo Linbeck III, and Tim Dunn. It targets both Democratic and Republican incumbents in primary elections.

In 2010, Ricketts led a campaign against earmarks and what he perceived to be wasteful federal spending. Ricketts founded an independent organization called Taxpayers Against Earmarks that classified every Member of Congress as either a spending "hero" or "hooligan."

Along with Taxpayers for Common Sense and WashingtonWatch.com, Taxpayers Against Earmarks developed a database of earmarks requested by members of Congress. The group successfully pressed for a moratorium on earmarks in 2010. Taxpayers Against Earmarks changed its name to Ending Spending in 2011, as part of a broadening of the group's focus.

Ricketts established and funded The Ending Spending Fund, a political action committee, in 2010. The Ending Spending Fund spent over $1 million sponsoring independent advertisements in several Congressional races. The goal of the advertising expenditure was to highlight incumbents' earmark-related policies. The Ending Spending Fund spent the largest amount of its money on the United States Senate election in Nevada, 2010 in an unsuccessful effort to defeat Senate Majority Leader Harry Reid. Although not required by law, Ricketts willingly disclosed his identity due to his belief in transparency.

Ricketts served on the board of trustees of the American Enterprise Institute from 1999 to 2007. His son, Pete Ricketts, is a member of the Republican National Committee and was elected governor of Nebraska in 2014. His daughter, Laura Ricketts, is a gay rights activist and prominent bundler
for Barack Obama. Another son, Todd Ricketts, was named CEO of Ending Spending in 2013.

On May 17, 2012, The New York Times published a story by Jeff Zeleny and Jim Rutenberg reporting that The Ending Spending Action fund had been presented with a 54-page proposal entitled, "The Defeat of Barack Hussein Obama: the Ricketts Plan to End His Spending for Good." According to  the Times, the proposal, written by a vendor seeking to be hired by Ending Spending, suggested a $10-million ad campaign to "attack President Obama in ways that Republicans have so far shied away" and called for "running commercials linking Mr. Obama to incendiary comments by his former spiritual adviser, the Reverend Jeremiah A. Wright." The report came to light when an unidentified person, who was not connected to the proposal, leaked it to The New York Times. The president of the Ending Spending Action Fund said that the pitch was a "nonstarter" and issued the following statement repudiating the proposal: "Not only was this plan merely a proposal—one of several submitted to the Ending Spending Action Fund by third-party vendors—but it reflects an approach to politics that Mr. Ricketts rejects and it was never a plan to be accepted but only a suggestion for a direction to take."

As of mid-2014, the Ending Spending SuperPac had supported only Republicans.

In the 2016 presidential election, Ricketts donated at least one million dollars in support of Donald Trump.
Ricketts also raised funds for the Future45 Super Pac and the 45Committee, a pro-Trump 501(c)4 organization that is not required to disclose its donors. During the Republican primaries, Ricketts had contributed to Our Principles PAC, a Super PAC dedicated to opposing Trump. Ricketts explained his changed position citing economic grounds, stating that Hillary Clinton "represents four more years of the Obama-Clinton economic policies that continue to cripple the middle class."

Philanthropy
Ricketts established the Opportunity Education Foundation, which underwrites the costs of training teachers and students in the Third World. The foundation supports an educational initiative through Louisiana College, a private Baptist college in Pineville, Louisiana, which trains teachers in East and West Africa.

On September 26, 2013, Louisiana College president Joe W. Aguillard presented Ricketts and his brother, Jim, with two of three Trustees' Distinguished Service Awards at the annual Founder's Day chapel. "The little help that we give is really absorbed and used a great deal ... Let me thank you, Louisiana College, for having such an impact on the educational system in the Third World," said Joe Ricketts. Jim Ricketts, the president and CEO of the foundation and the former vice-president of TD Ameritrade, said, "We're serving the poor in ways that have never been done before ..."

Anti-Muslim and racist email controversy
On 5 February 2019, Splinter News released a cache of Ricketts emails from 2009 to 2014. He described Islam as a cult and not as a religion. He wrote that Islam could not create a civil society, that "we cannot ever let Islam become a large part of our society", and that "Muslims are naturally my (our) enemy." Included were Obama citizenship conspiracy theory emails, and claims that Obama favored Islam over other religions. Also included were multiple racist "joke" emails that he received and responded to positively; including slurs against Black and Hispanic people. He apologized for the emails after they were made public.

References

External links

Official site

1941 births
Living people
American billionaires
American financial company founders
American chairpersons of corporations
American chief executives of financial services companies
American philanthropists
Businesspeople from Omaha, Nebraska
Businesspeople from Wyoming
Creighton University alumni
Nebraska Republicans
People from Jackson, Wyoming
Wyoming Republicans
20th-century American businesspeople
21st-century American businesspeople
Chicago Cubs owners
Ricketts family
People from Nebraska City, Nebraska
American Enterprise Institute